Charles W. "Chuck" Wiger Sr. (born September 14, 1951) is a Minnesota politician and member of the Minnesota Senate. A member of the Minnesota Democratic–Farmer–Labor Party (DFL), he represents District 43, which includes parts of Ramsey and Washington counties in the northeastern Twin Cities metropolitan area.

Early life, education, and career
Wiger graduated magna cum laude from Hamline University in Saint Paul in 1974 and earned his J.D. from the Hamline University School of Law in 1977. In 1993 he attended graduate school at the School for Institution Management at the University of Colorado in Boulder.

Wiger has been active in Ramsey County and metropolitan government. He was a member of the Metropolitan Council from 1983 to 1989. He is a former chair and member of the Ramsey County Soil and Water Conservation District. He was a member of the Ramsey County Parks and Recreation Commission and a liaison to the Metropolitan Parks and Open Space Commission. He is an attorney and a writer by profession.

Minnesota Senate
Wiger was first elected to the Senate in 1996 and has been reelected in every subsequent election.

As of 2021, he serves on the following committees:

 Capital Investment
 Local Government Policy
 Veterans and Military Affairs Finance and Policy
 Education Finance and Policy

His special legislative concerns include education, economic development, the environment, and water sustainability.

Personal life
Wiger has actively served the education community in his area. He was the founding chair of the North St. Paul-Maplewood-Oakdale Community Education Board, and served on the board from 1973 to 1990. He was also founding chair of the East Communities Youth Service Bureau, and served as a director for Northeast Metropolitan Intermediate School District 916.

His daughter Carolyn competed on Survivor 44.

References

External links

Senator Chuck Wiger official Minnesota Senate website
Minnesota Public Radio Votetracker: Senator Charles Wiger
Project Vote Smart – Senator Charles Wiger Profile

1951 births
Living people
Democratic Party Minnesota state senators
Politicians from Saint Paul, Minnesota
Hamline University School of Law alumni
21st-century American politicians